The Degoodi or Degodia is a Somali clan.

They are genealogically related to the other Samaale, but in particular to the Garjante, Gaalje'el, Garre, Masare, Isa (Saransor) and 'Awrmale, with which they share the same ancestor Gardhere Samaale.

History 
When Arthur Donaldson Smith traveled through what is now Bare woreda in 1895, he found that the Degodia were neighbors of the Afgab clan (whom they were at endless war with), their territory stretching east to the Weyib and Dawa Rivers. 

So far there are 12 Wabars who served the community:

1. Wabar Cuudow
2. Wabar Amiin
3. Wabar Ali
4. Wabar Omar
5. Wabar Caalin
6. Wabar Abdi
7. Wabar Omar
8. Wabar Ali
9. Wabar Hassan
10. Wabar Osman
11. Wabar Abdi
12. Wabar Abdille (incumbent)

Clan tree 
The Max Planck Institute for Social Anthropology's Conflict analysis in Bakool and Bay, South-western Somalia (2004) shows the following clan tree for the Degoodi:

- Samaale
 Gardheere
 Garjente
 Adow 
 'Owrmale
 Garre
 Saransoor
 Degodia
 Gaaljeel
 Masaare
 Isa

References

Somali clans
Ethnic groups in Kenya